The LeBeau Plantation was an historic plantation house in Arabi, Louisiana. It was located on one of the largest plantations south of New Orleans

The house was built as a private residence by Francois LeBeau in 1854. LeBeau had purchased the land in 1851 and demolished existing house. Though LeBeau died the year that the house was completed, his widow Sylvanie Fuselier lived there until her death in 1879.
Between the 1920s and the 1940s, the LeBeau Plantation was known as the Cardone Hotel.

On Thursday, June 26, 1986, the LeBeau Plantation house was damaged in an act of arson. On Friday, November 22, 2013, the house was destroyed by a second act of arson.  According to investigators, seven intoxicated men, ranging in age from 17 to 31, had been searching for ghosts inside the building. Aggravated by their lack of success, they decided to set fire to the house.

References

Sources
Starr, S. Frederick (April 2008). "Arabi's Forlorn Gem: The LeBeau Plantation". Preservation in Print. p. 18-19.

Plantation houses in Louisiana
Buildings and structures in St. Bernard Parish, Louisiana
Houses completed in 1854
Buildings and structures in the United States destroyed by arson
Burned houses in the United States